Newton Bewley is a village and civil parish in the borough of Hartlepool and the ceremonial county of County Durham, England. It is situated between the towns of Hartlepool and Billingham.  The postal area code is TS22 for Teesside but uses a Sedgefield telephone area code. At the 2011 census  the population of the civil parish was less than 100. Details can be found in the parish of Greatham.

A settlement called Neuton de Beaulu is mentioned in account books for Durham Priory from 1334. "Bewley", meaning "beautiful place", was the name of a manor in the area; the villages of Newton Bewley and Cowpen Bewley retain this name although the manor itself is gone.

References

External links

Villages in County Durham
Borough of Hartlepool
Places in the Tees Valley